10R may refer to:

 10R, one of the standard photographic print sizes
Kawasaki Ninja ZX-10R, a Kawasaki sport motorcycle
iPhone XR, with the Roman numeral X.